Gedu College of Business Studies is an autonomous government college affiliated with the Royal University of Bhutan, offering full-time contemporary business and management education in Bhutan. It is located in the town of Gedu.

In 2012, the college started offering a master's degree program in business studies. 
The college is accredited "A" by Bhutan Accreditation Council (BAC) in 2017.

References

External links 
 https://www.facebook.com/GCBSofficial/

Educational institutions established in 2001
Universities in Bhutan
2001 establishments in Bhutan